Standard Bank Namibia Limited, commonly referred to as Standard Bank Namibia, is a commercial bank in Namibia. It is licensed, supervised and regulated by the Bank of Namibia, the central bank and national banking regulator. Since 19 November 2019, the stock of the holding company of this bank, going by the name Standard Bank Namibia Holdings Limited is listed on the Namibian Stock Exchange (NSX), where it trades under the symbol SNO.

SNO and its subsidiaries are members of the Standard Bank Group, a financial services conglomerate, headquartered in South Africa, with subsidiaries in 20 African countries, and with total assets worth nearly US$143 billion, as of 31 December 2020.

Overview
Standard Bank Namibia Limited is a large financial services organisation in Namibia. As of 31 December 2020, SNO had assets valued at NAD:33,309,509,000 (US$:2,354,220,000), with shareholders' equity of NAD:3,720,927,000 (approximately: US$262,984,000). At that time, the institution employed in excess of 1,500 people in 63 interlinked brick-and-mortar branches and maintained 372 automated teller machines.

Ownership
The shares of stock of Standard Bank Namibia Holdings Limited are listed in the Namibian Stock Exchange, where they trade under the symbol SNO. The ownership in the company stock is as illustrated in the table below:

Governance
As of May 2021, the chairman of the Board of Directors of Standard Bank Namibia Holdings Limited, is Herbert Maier, a non-executive director. The managing director and chief executive officer is Mercia Geises.

See also
 Economy of Namibia
 Standard Bank of South Africa
 List of banks in Namibia

References

External links
 Official Website

Banks of Namibia
Companies listed on the Namibian Stock Exchange
Companies based in Windhoek
Banks established in 1915
1915 establishments in South West Africa